In category theory and related fields of mathematics, a refinement is a construction that generalizes the operations of "interior enrichment", like bornologification or saturation of a locally convex space. A dual construction is called envelope.

Definition 

 
 
Notations:

 

 
 

 
 

Examples 

 The saturation  of a pseudocomplete locally convex space  is a refinement in the category  of locally convex spaces by means of the subcategory  of the Smith spaces:

See also
Envelope

Notes

References 

 

Category theory
Duality theories
Functional analysis